Milan Antonović (Милан Антоновић; Belgrade, Principality of Serbia, 1850 – Belgrade, Kingdom of Yugoslavia, 1929) was a Serbian architect. His style is characterized by Eclecticism in architecture, with influences from both academic Neoclassicism architecture and the Vienna Secession.

Works in Belgrade 

 Anker Bar at 26 Terazije, built in 1893;
 Elementary School at Palilula (Osnovna skola "Vuk Karadzic", 41 Takovska Street, 1894);
 Photographic Studio of Milan Jovanović, built in 1903;
 House of Dimitrije Živadinović, built in 1904;
 Military Hospital Complex at Vračar (Vojna bolnica na Vračaru', 1904-1909);
 Grand Hotel at 5 Knez Mihailova Street, built in 1919;
 Home of the Society for the Beautification of Vračar (Dom Drustva za ulepsavanja Vračara''), built in 1926.

See also
 List of Serbian architects

References 

Serbian architects
1850 births
1929 deaths